Tarigri Sharif is a village in Sialkot District, Pakistan.

References

Villages in Sialkot District